Raby may refer to:

Places

Australia
 Raby, Catherine Field, a heritage-listed house in Catherine Field, a suburb in south-western Sydney, New South Wales
 Raby, New South Wales, a suburb of Sydney, New South Wales
 Raby Bay, a bay within Moreton Bay, Queensland

Czech Republic
 Ráby, a village in the Pardubice Region

United Kingdom
 Raby Castle, a castle in County Durham, England
 Raby, Cumbria, a village in Cumbria, England
 Raby, Merseyside, a village on the Wirral Peninsula, Merseyside, England

Sweden
 Råby, Håbo Municipality, Uppsala County

People
 Baron Raby, several people with this title

Surname
 Albert Raby (1933–1988), American teacher in Chicago
 Augustin-Jérôme Raby (1745–1822), Canadian pilot and political figure
 Henry James Raby (1827–1907), recipient of the Victoria Cross
 Ian Raby (1921–1967), British racing driver
 James Joseph Raby (1874–1934), Rear Admiral of the US Navy
 Noah Raby (died 1904), American notable for his longevity claim
 Philip Raby(born 1963), UK motoring journalist
 Walter Raby (1902–1973), English footballer

Given name
 Raby Howell (1869–1937), English footballer

Other
 , a destroyer escort named after Admiral James Raby
 , a World War II destroyer escort